Walter Lee Harris (born  April 1, 1964) is a former American football defensive back. He played for the San Diego Chargers in 1987.

References

1964 births
Living people
American football defensive backs
Stanford Cardinal football players
San Diego Chargers players
Stanford Cardinal baseball players